Hunter is a 1989 novel written by William Luther Pierce, a Neo-Nazi and the founder and chairman of National Alliance, a white nationalist group, under the pseudonym Andrew Macdonald. Pierce also used this pseudonym to write the better-known The Turner Diaries, a 1978 novel with similar themes.  Some consider Hunter a prequel to the Turner Diaries, detailing the rise of the racist paramilitary group termed 'The Organization', which would play a dominant role in the book.

Hunter portrays the actions of Oscar Yeager (anglicization of Jäger, German for hunter), a Vietnam veteran F-4 Phantom pilot and Washington, D.C.-area Defense Department consultant who embarks on a plan to assassinate interracial couples and public figures advocating civil rights in the D.C. area.  Yeager's crimes quickly lead to broad national repercussions and draw him into the plans of both a white nationalist group and an ambitious FBI official eager to take advantage of the turmoil he has helped to start.

Hunter shares with The Turner Diaries Pierce's depiction of the United States as overrun by liberalism and covertly dominated by Jews. His depiction of the protagonists and their attitudes toward Jews, African-Americans, Latinos, and Asians mirror the ideology of Pierce and National Alliance. Hunter reveals this ideology more didactically and directly than did The Turner Diaries. At the novel's beginning, the protagonist is a nonideological racist unattached to antisemitism. He gradually develops his ideology and perspectives during his campaign and through contact with the allies that he meets. Much of the story's dialogue consists of discussion and debate on the "Jewish question."

Pierce's rationale 
In contrast to The Turner Diaries, Pierce decided to write a "more realistic novel, Hunter, which shifted away from the idea of an organized group to what an exceptional individual can do. Hunter serves a real educational process."

Pierce dedicated Hunter to Joseph Paul Franklin who, the notice says, "saw his duty as a White man." Franklin was a white supremacist serial killer who murdered up to 22 people in sniper-style attacks.

Plot summary
The story is set in the United States, presumably during the late 1980s or early 1990s. It begins with Yeager driving around Washington D.C with a rifle. In his personal campaign of assassination, he initially shoots racially mixed couples in parking lots. Over 22 days, his campaign leads to 12 victims in 6 shootings. In the narrative, Yeager is depicted as the hero. His campaign escalates to more sophisticated methods against higher-profile targets, including prominent journalists and politicians whom Yeager sees as promoting racial mixing. At the same time, Yeager and his girlfriend are developing connections with a white nationalist group.

After several successful and increasingly ambitious attacks, Yeager is found and confronted by a senior agent of the FBI who himself is disgusted with Jewish control of the FBI and the American social situation. This agent blackmails Yeager into assisting him with his career by assassinating several Jewish FBI agents and targeting Mossad agents in the United States so that the agent can be appointed as the head of a newly formed antiterrorist secret police agency, assume increasing control of the United States and use his power to challenge and remove Jewish control of the government and media.

At the same time, Yeager's white nationalist group achieves growing prominence through the insertion of one of their members into a Christian evangelist television broadcasting ministry, from which he is broadcasting increasingly racist and antisemitic messages. Yeager's campaign of assassination and terrorism, the actions of copycats and imitators, the white nationalist broadcasting effort, the efforts of the antiterrorist official, and a rapid decline of the US economy all work to push the United States towards increasing racial and social violence and fragmentation.

Eventually, Yeager is faced with a dilemma when the government official for whom he has been working finally orders him to kill the undercover evangelist minister, whose efforts oppose the agent's intent to establish order and strike a temporary bargain with the Jews. Yeager attempts to avoid the assignment and then deliberately appears to bungle the assassination. At this point, Yeager is caught between the intentions of his government confederate (who intends to consolidate his own power and control over the government and reform the system from the top down after suppressing upcoming black nationalist riots) and the white-nationalist group who wishes to stir up the chaos even further, draw white Americans into battle, and eventually overthrow the government. Ultimately, Yeager kills the government agent.

Following this, the Jewish-controlled media side with the black rioters, revealing that the government official would have been double-crossed had he attempted to strike his deal. Yeager and the other members of the group, now under increasing government scrutiny, resolve to continue their efforts and to go "underground" to continue the fight against the system.

References

Bibliography
Gardell, Mattias. (2003) Gods of the Blood: The Pagan Revival and White Separatism, Duke University Press. pp. 91, 93, 134; reviewed 360 n.31. 
Griffin, Robert S. (2001) The Fame of a Dead Man's Deeds: An Up-Close Portrait of White Nationalist William Pierce, 1st Book Library. pp. 223–243. 

1989 American novels
American political novels
Antisemitic novels
Conspiracist media
Novels about terrorism
Novels by William Luther Pierce
Neo-Nazism in the United States
Works published under a pseudonym
Neo-Nazi propaganda